The 2015 San Luis Open Challenger Tour was a professional tennis tournament played on hard courts. It was the 22nd edition of the tournament which was part of the 2015 ATP Challenger Tour. It took place in San Luis Potosí, Mexico between 31 March and 5 April.

Singles main-draw entrants

Seeds

 1 Rankings are as of March 23, 2015

Other entrants
The following players received wildcards into the singles main draw:
  Mauricio Astorga
  Daniel Garza
  Manuel Sánchez
  Tigre Hank

The following players received entry from the qualifying draw:

  Caio Zampieri
  Eduardo Struvay
  Iván Endara
  Juan Sebastián Gómez

The following player received entry as a lucky loser:
  Giovanni Lapentti

The following player received entry as an alternate:
  Andrés Molteni

Champions

Singles

 Guido Pella def.  James McGee, 6–3, 6–3

Doubles

 Guillermo Durán /  Horacio Zeballos def.  Sergio Galdós /  Guido Pella, 7–6(7–4), 6–4

References
 Combined Main Draw

External links
Official Website

San Luis Open Challenger Tour
San Luis Potosí Challenger